Old Joy is a 2006 American road movie written and directed by Kelly Reichardt and based on a short story by Jonathan Raymond. The original soundtrack for the film is by Yo La Tengo and included on the compilation soundtrack album  They Shoot, We Score.

Plot
Old Joy tells the story of two friends, Kurt and Mark, as they reunite for a weekend camping trip in the Cascade mountain range and Bagby Hot Springs, east of Portland, Oregon. Kurt lives a hand-to-mouth hippie lifestyle, while Mark has moved on from that scene and gotten a proper job and a house. The film is a story of friendship, loss and alienation. For Mark, the weekend outing offers a respite from the pressure of his imminent fatherhood. Tagging along for the ride is Lucy, Mark's dog.

Critical reception
Old Joy received favorable reviews from critics. The review aggregator Rotten Tomatoes reported that 85% of critics gave the film positive reviews, based on 94 reviews — with the consensus that "a serene, melancholy beauty permeates this meditative film." Metacritic reported the film had an average score of 84 out of 100, based on 24 reviews. The New York Times called it "one of the finest American films of the year".

The film appeared on several critics' top ten lists of the best films of 2006.
2nd - Ella Taylor, LA Weekly
4th - Marc Mohan, Portland Oregonian
4th - Scott Tobias, The A.V. Club
4th - Ty Burr, The Boston Globe
8th - Lisa Schwarzbaum, Entertainment Weekly
10th - Wesley Morris, The Boston Globe

The film also won awards from the Los Angeles Film Critics Association, the Rotterdam International Film Festival, and the Sarasota Film Festival. Neil Kopp won the Producer's Award at the Independent Spirit Awards for his work on Old Joy and Paranoid Park.

In reviewing The Criterion Collection's Blu-ray release of the film, critic Svet Atanasov of Blu-ray.com was disappointed with Old Joy, stating that though Reichardt is a gifted director, "[the film] is so introverted that it quickly creates the impression that it wishes to be left alone.... instead of bringing the viewer closer to the campers the film essentially gives them more space to figure out how they feel about their friendship and lives."

References

External links

The New York Times review by Dennis Lim
Old Joy: Northwest Passages an essay by Ed Halter at The Criterion Collection
 2006 Reichardt interview at Reverse Shot — Themes, politics, characters, filming, influences, music.

2006 films
2000s road movies
American road movies
American buddy drama films
Films based on short fiction
Films directed by Kelly Reichardt
Films set in Oregon
Films shot in Oregon
Films shot in Portland, Oregon
Films shot in 16 mm film
2006 independent films
2000s buddy drama films
2000s English-language films
2000s American films